Rodolfo Vera Quizon Sr.  (July 25, 1928 – July 10, 2012), better known by his stage name Dolphy, was a Filipino comedian and actor. He is widely regarded as the country's King of Comedy for his comedic talent embodied by his long roster of works on stage, radio, television and movies.

Television

Films

2010s

2000s

1990s

1980s

1970s

1960s

1950s

1940s

References

Philippine filmographies